Exxaro Resources Limited (Exxaro, the company or the group) is a South Africa-based diversified resources company with a robust coal business and acquisitive growth prospects in minerals and energy solutions.

Exxaro is among the top five coal producers in South Africa.

The company is listed on the Johannesburg Stock Exchange and at 31 December 2021, had assets of R75.7 billion  and a market capitalisation of R53.4 billion. Exxaro Resources Ltd has been approved for a secondary listing on A2X Markets on Thursday, 2 April 2020.

Background
The company was formerly known as Kumba Resources Limited and changed its name to Exxaro Resources Limited in November 2006. Exxaro Resources Limited is a subsidiary of Main Street 333 Proprietary Limited.

Exxaro Resources announced in October 2012 plans for a "mine of the future" concept. The mine targets zero waste emissions, zero effluent, wash-to-zero and sustainable engineering.

References

External links

Exxaro 
Toliara Sands
Kumba Iron Ore
Kumba Resources (redirects to Exxaro and/or Kumba Iron Ore)
MBendi:Organizations:Kumba

Mining companies of South Africa
Coal companies of South Africa
Companies based in the City of Tshwane
Iron ore mining companies
Organisations based in Pretoria
Companies listed on the Johannesburg Stock Exchange
Year of establishment unknown
Metal companies of South Africa